Faith healing is the practice of prayer and gestures (such as laying on of hands) that are believed by some to elicit divine intervention in spiritual and physical healing, especially the Christian practice. Believers assert that the healing of disease and disability can be brought about by religious faith through prayer or other rituals that, according to adherents, can stimulate a divine presence and power. Religious belief in divine intervention does not depend on empirical evidence of an evidence-based outcome achieved via faith healing. Virtually all scientists and philosophers dismiss faith healing as pseudoscience.

Claims that "a myriad of techniques" such as prayer, divine intervention, or the ministrations of an individual healer can cure illness have been popular throughout history. There have been claims that faith can cure blindness, deafness, cancer, HIV/AIDS, developmental disorders, anemia, arthritis, corns, defective speech, multiple sclerosis, skin rashes, total body paralysis, and various injuries. Recoveries have been attributed to many techniques commonly classified as faith healing. It can involve prayer, a visit to a religious shrine, or simply a strong belief in a supreme being.

Many people interpret the Bible, especially the New Testament, as teaching belief in, and the practice of, faith healing. According to a 2004 Newsweek poll, 72 percent of Americans said they believe that praying to God can cure someone, even if science says the person has an incurable disease. Unlike faith healing, advocates of spiritual healing make no attempt to seek divine intervention, instead believing in divine energy. The increased interest in alternative medicine at the end of the 20th century has given rise to a parallel interest among sociologists in the relationship of religion to health.

Faith healing can be classified as a spiritual, supernatural, or paranormal topic, and, in some cases, belief in faith healing can be classified as magical thinking. The American Cancer Society states "available scientific evidence does not support claims that faith healing can actually cure physical ailments". "Death, disability, and other unwanted outcomes have occurred when faith healing was elected instead of medical care for serious injuries or illnesses." When parents have practiced faith healing rather than medical care, many children have died that otherwise would have been expected to live. Similar results are found in adults.

In various belief systems

Christianity

Overview

Regarded as a Christian belief that God heals people through the power of the Holy Spirit, faith healing often involves the laying on of hands. It is also called supernatural healing, divine healing, and miracle healing, among other things. Healing in the Bible is often associated with the ministry of specific individuals including Elijah, Jesus and Paul.

Christian physician Reginald B. Cherry views faith healing as a pathway of healing in which God uses both the natural and the supernatural to heal. Being healed has been described as a privilege of accepting Christ's redemption on the cross. Pentecostal writer Wilfred Graves Jr. views the healing of the body as a physical expression of salvation. , after describing Jesus exorcising at sunset and healing all of the sick who were brought to him, quotes these miracles as a fulfillment of the prophecy in : "He took up our infirmities and carried our diseases".

Even those Christian writers who believe in faith healing do not all believe that one's faith presently brings about the desired healing. "[Y]our faith does not effect your healing now. When you are healed rests entirely on what the sovereign purposes of the Healer are." Larry Keefauver cautions against allowing enthusiasm for faith healing to stir up false hopes. "Just believing hard enough, long enough or strong enough will not strengthen you or prompt your healing. Doing mental gymnastics to 'hold on to your miracle' will not cause your healing to manifest now." Those who actively lay hands on others and pray with them to be healed are usually aware that healing may not always follow immediately. Proponents of faith healing say it may come later, and it may not come in this life. "The truth is that your healing may manifest in eternity, not in time".

New Testament

Parts of the four canonical gospels in the New Testament say that Jesus cured physical ailments well outside the capacity of first-century medicine. Jesus' healing acts are considered miraculous and spectacular due to the results being impossible or statistically improbable. One example is the case of "a woman who had had a discharge of blood for twelve years, and who had suffered much under many physicians, and had spent all that she had, and was not better but rather grew worse". After healing her, Jesus tells her "Daughter, your faith has made you well. Go in peace! Be cured from your illness".

Jesus endorsed the use of the medical assistance of the time (medicines of oil and wine) when he told the parable of the Good Samaritan (Luke 10:25–37), who "bound up [an injured man's] wounds, pouring on oil and wine" (verse 34) as a physician would. Jesus then told the doubting teacher of the law (who had elicited this parable by his self-justifying question, "And who is my neighbor?" in verse 29) to "go, and do likewise" in loving others with whom he would never ordinarily associate (verse 37).

The healing in the gospels is referred to as a "sign" to prove Jesus' divinity and to foster belief in him as the Christ. However, when asked for other types of miracles, Jesus refused some but granted others in consideration of the motive of the request. Some theologians' understanding is that Jesus healed all who were present every single time. Sometimes he determines whether they had faith that he would heal them. Four of the seven miraculous signs performed in the Fourth Gospel that indicated he was sent from God were acts of healing or resurrection. He heals the Capernaum official's son, heals a paralytic by the pool in Bethsaida, healing a man born blind, and resurrecting Lazarus of Bethany.

Jesus told his followers to heal the sick and stated that signs such as healing are evidence of faith. Jesus also told his followers to "cure sick people, raise up dead persons, make lepers clean, expel demons. You received free, give free".

Jesus sternly ordered many who received healing from him: "Do not tell anyone!" Jesus did not approve of anyone asking for a sign just for the spectacle of it, describing such as coming from a "wicked and adulterous generation".

The apostle Paul believed healing is one of the special gifts of the Holy Spirit, and that the possibility exists that certain persons may possess this gift to an extraordinarily high degree.

In the New Testament Epistle of James, the faithful are told that to be healed, those who are sick should call upon the elders of the church to pray over [them] and anoint [them] with oil in the name of the Lord.

The New Testament says that during Jesus' ministry and after his Resurrection, the apostles healed the sick and cast out demons, made lame men walk, raised the dead and performed other miracles. Apostles were holy men who had direct access to God and could channel his power to help and heal people. For example, Saint Peter healed a disabled man.

Jesus used miracles to convince people that he was inaugurating the Messianic Age, as in Mt 12.28. Scholars have described Jesus' miracles as establishing the kingdom during his lifetime.

Early Christian church
Accounts or references to healing appear in the writings of many Ante Nicene Fathers, although many of these mentions are very general and do not include specifics.

Catholicism

The Roman Catholic Church recognizes two "not mutually exclusive" kinds of healing, one justified by science and one justified by faith:
 healing by human "natural means  through the practice of medicine" which emphasizes that the theological virtue of "charity demands that we not neglect natural means of healing people who are ill" and the cardinal virtue of prudence forewarns not "to employ a technique that has no scientific support (or even plausibility)"
 healing by divine grace "interceded on behalf of the sick through the invocation of the name of the Lord Jesus, asking for healing through the power of the Holy Spirit, whether in the form of the sacramental laying on of hands and anointing with oil or of simple prayers for healing, which often include an appeal to the saints for their aid"

In 2000, the Congregation for the Doctrine of the Faith issued "Instruction on prayers for healing" with specific norms about prayer meetings for obtaining healing, which presents the Catholic Church's doctrines of sickness and healing.

It accepts "that there may be means of natural healing that have not yet been understood or recognized by science", but it rejects superstitious practices which are neither compatible with Christian teaching nor compatible with scientific evidence.

Faith healing is reported by Catholics as the result of intercessory prayer to a saint or to a person with the gift of healing. According to U.S. Catholic magazine, "Even in this skeptical, postmodern, scientific agemiracles really are possible." According to a Newsweek poll, three-fourths of American Catholics say they pray for "miracles" of some sort.

According to John Cavadini, when healing is granted, "The miracle is not primarily for the person healed, but for all people, as a sign of God's work in the ultimate healing called 'salvation', or a sign of the kingdom that is coming." Some might view their own healing as a sign they are particularly worthy or holy, while others do not deserve it.

The Catholic Church has a special Congregation dedicated to the careful investigation of the validity of alleged miracles attributed to prospective saints. Pope Francis tightened the rules on money and miracles in the canonization process. Since Catholic Christians believe the lives of canonized saints in the Church will reflect Christ's, many have come to expect healing miracles. While the popular conception of a miracle can be wide-ranging, the Catholic Church has a specific definition for the kind of miracle formally recognized in a canonization process.

According to Catholic Encyclopedia, it is often said that cures at shrines and during Christian pilgrimages are mainly due to psychotherapypartly to confident trust in Divine providence, and partly to the strong expectancy of cure that comes over suggestible persons at these times and places.

Among the best-known accounts by Catholics of faith healings are those attributed to the miraculous intercession of the apparition of the Blessed Virgin Mary known as Our Lady of Lourdes at the Sanctuary of Our Lady of Lourdes in France and the remissions of life-threatening disease claimed by those who have applied for aid to Saint Jude, who is known as the "patron saint of lost causes".

, Catholic medics have asserted that there have been 67 miracles and 7,000 unexplainable medical cures at Lourdes since 1858. In a 1908 book, it says these cures were subjected to intense medical scrutiny and were only recognized as authentic spiritual cures after a commission of doctors and scientists, called the Lourdes Medical Bureau, had ruled out any physical mechanism for the patient's recovery.

Evangelicalism 

In some Pentecostal and Charismatic Evangelical churches, a special place is thus reserved for faith healings with laying on of hands during worship services or for campaigns evangelization. Faith healing or divine healing is considered to be an inheritance of Jesus acquired by his death and resurrection. Biblical inerrancy ensures that the miracles and healings described in the Bible are still relevant and may be present in the life of the believer.

At the beginning of the 20th century, the new Pentecostal movement drew participants from the Holiness movement and other movements in America that already believed in divine healing. By the 1930s, several faith healers drew large crowds and established worldwide followings.

The first Pentecostals in the modern sense appeared in Topeka, Kansas, in a Bible school conducted by Charles Fox Parham, a holiness teacher and former Methodist pastor. Pentecostalism achieved worldwide attention in 1906 through the Azusa Street Revival in Los Angeles led by William Joseph Seymour.

Smith Wigglesworth was also a well-known figure in the early part of the 20th century. A former English plumber turned evangelist who lived simply and read nothing but the Bible from the time his wife taught him to read, Wigglesworth traveled around the world preaching about Jesus and performing faith healings. Wigglesworth claimed to raise several people from the dead in Jesus' name in his meetings.

During the 1920s and 1930s, Aimee Semple McPherson was a controversial faith healer of growing popularity during the Great Depression. Subsequently, William M. Branham has been credited as the initiator of the post-World War II healing revivals. The healing revival he began led many to emulate his style and spawned a generation of faith healers. Because of this, Branham has been recognized as the "father of modern faith healers". According to writer and researcher Patsy Sims, "the power of a Branham service and his stage presence remains a legend unparalleled in the history of the Charismatic movement". By the late 1940s, Oral Roberts, who was associated with and promoted by Branham's Voice of Healing magazine also became well known, and he continued with faith healing until the 1980s. Roberts discounted faith healing in the late 1950s, stating, "I never was a faith healer and I was never raised that way. My parents believed very strongly in medical science and we have a doctor who takes care of our children when they get sick. I cannot heal anyone – God does that." A friend of Roberts was Kathryn Kuhlman, another popular faith healer, who gained fame in the 1950s and had a television program on CBS. Also in this era, Jack Coe and A. A. Allen were faith healers who traveled with large tents for large open-air crusades.

Oral Roberts's successful use of television as a medium to gain a wider audience led others to follow suit. His former pilot, Kenneth Copeland, started a healing ministry. Pat Robertson, Benny Hinn, and Peter Popoff became well-known televangelists who claimed to heal the sick. Richard Rossi is known for advertising his healing clinics through secular television and radio. Kuhlman influenced Benny Hinn, who adopted some of her techniques and wrote a book about her.

Christian Science
Christian Science claims that healing is possible through prayer based on an understanding of God and the underlying spiritual perfection of God's creation. The material world as humanly perceived is believed to not be the spiritual reality. Christian Scientists believe that healing through prayer is possible insofar as it succeeds in bringing the spiritual reality of health into human experience. Christian Scientists believe that prayer does not change the spiritual creation but gives a clearer view of it, and the result appears in the human scene as healing: the human picture adjusts to coincide more nearly with the divine reality. Christian Scientists do not consider themselves to be faith healers since faith or belief in Christian Science is not required on the part of the patient, and because they consider it reliable and provable rather than random.

Although there is no hierarchy in Christian Science, Christian Science practitioners devote full time to prayer for others on a professional basis, and advertise in an online directory published by the church. Christian Scientists sometimes tell their stories of healing at weekly testimony meetings at local Christian Science churches, or publish them in the church's magazines including The Christian Science Journal printed monthly since 1883, the Christian Science Sentinel printed weekly since 1898, and The Herald of Christian Science a foreign language magazine beginning with a German edition in 1903 and later expanding to Spanish, French, and Portuguese editions. Christian Science Reading Rooms often have archives of such healing accounts.

The Church of Jesus Christ of Latter-day Saints
The Church of Jesus Christ of Latter-day Saints (LDS) has had a long history of faith healings. Many members of the LDS Church have told their stories of healing within the LDS publication, the Ensign. The church believes healings come most often as a result of priesthood blessings given by the laying on of hands; however, prayer often accompanied with fasting is also thought to cause healings. Healing is always attributed to be God's power. Latter-day Saints believe that the Priesthood of God, held by prophets (such as Moses) and worthy disciples of the Savior, was restored via heavenly messengers to the first prophet of this dispensation, Joseph Smith.

According to LDS doctrine, even though members may have the restored priesthood authority to heal in the name of Jesus Christ, all efforts should be made to seek the appropriate medical help. Brigham Young stated this effectively, while also noting that the ultimate outcome is still dependent on the will of God.

Islam

A number of healing traditions exist among Muslims. Some healers are particularly focused on diagnosing cases of possession by jinn or demons.

Buddhism
Chinese-born Australian businessman Jun Hong Lu was a prominent proponent of the "Guan Yin Citta Dharma Door", claiming that practicing the three "golden practices" of reciting texts and mantras, liberation of beings, and making vows, laid a solid foundation for improved physical, mental, and psychological well-being, with many followers publicly attesting to have been healed through practice.

Scientology
Some critics of Scientology have referred to some of its practices as being similar to faith healing, based on claims made by L. Ron Hubbard in Dianetics: The Modern Science of Mental Health and other writings.

Scientific investigation

Nearly all scientists dismiss faith healing as pseudoscience. Believers assert that faith healing makes no scientific claims and thus should be treated as a matter of faith that is not testable by science. Critics reply that claims of medical cures should be tested scientifically because, although faith in the supernatural is not in itself usually considered to be the purview of science, claims of reproducible effects are nevertheless subject to scientific investigation.

Scientists and doctors generally find that faith healing lacks biological plausibility or epistemic warrant, which is one of the criteria used to judge whether clinical research is ethical and financially justified. A Cochrane review of intercessory prayer found "although some of the results of individual studies suggest a positive effect of intercessory prayer, the majority do not". The authors concluded: "We are not convinced that further trials of this intervention should be undertaken and would prefer to see any resources available for such a trial used to investigate other questions in health care".

A review in 1954 investigated spiritual healing, therapeutic touch and faith healing. Of the hundred cases reviewed, none revealed that the healer's intervention alone resulted in any improvement or cure of a measurable organic disability.

In addition, at least one study has suggested that adult Christian Scientists, who generally use prayer rather than medical care, have a higher death rate than other people of the same age.

The Global Medical Research Institute (GMRI) was created in 2012 to start collecting medical records of patients who claim to have received a supernatural healing miracle as a result of Christian Spiritual Healing practices. The organization has a panel of medical doctors who review the patient's records looking at entries prior to the claimed miracles and entries after the miracle was claimed to have taken place. "The overall goal of GMRI is to promote an empirically grounded understanding of the physiological, emotional, and sociological effects of Christian Spiritual Healing practices". This is accomplished by applying the same rigorous standards used in other forms of medical and scientific research.

A 2011 article in the New Scientist magazine cited positive physical results from meditation, positive thinking and spiritual faith

Criticism

Skeptics of faith healing offer primarily two explanations for anecdotes of cures or improvements, relieving any need to appeal to the supernatural. The first is post hoc ergo propter hoc, meaning that a genuine improvement or spontaneous remission may have been experienced coincidental with but independent from anything the faith healer or patient did or said. These patients would have improved just as well even had they done nothing. The second is the placebo effect, through which a person may experience genuine pain relief and other symptomatic alleviation. In this case, the patient genuinely has been helped by the faith healer or faith-based remedy, not through any mysterious or numinous function, but by the power of their own belief that they would be healed. In both cases the patient may experience a real reduction in symptoms, though in neither case has anything miraculous or inexplicable occurred. Both cases, however, are strictly limited to the body's natural abilities.

According to the American Cancer Society:

The American Medical Association considers that prayer as therapy should not be a medically reimbursable or deductible expense.

Belgian philosopher and skeptic Etienne Vermeersch coined the term Lourdes effect as a criticism of the magical thinking and placebo effect possibilities for the claimed miraculous cures as there are no documented events where a severed arm has been reattached through faith healing at Lourdes. Vermeersch identifies ambiguity and equivocal nature of the miraculous cures as a key feature of miraculous events.

Negative impact on public health
Reliance on faith healing to the exclusion of other forms of treatment can have a public health impact when it reduces or eliminates access to modern medical techniques. This is evident in both higher mortality rates for children and in reduced life expectancy for adults. Critics have also made note of serious injury that has resulted from falsely labelled "healings", where patients erroneously consider themselves cured and cease or withdraw from treatment. For example, at least six people have died after faith healing by their church and being told they had been healed of HIV and could stop taking their medications. It is the stated position of the AMA that "prayer as therapy should not delay access to traditional medical care". Choosing faith healing while rejecting modern medicine can and does cause people to die needlessly.

Christian theological criticism of faith healing
Christian theological criticism of faith healing broadly falls into two distinct levels of disagreement.

The first is widely termed the "open-but-cautious" view of the miraculous in the church today. This term is deliberately used by Robert L. Saucy in the book Are Miraculous Gifts for Today?. Don Carson is another example of a Christian teacher who has put forward what has been described as an "open-but-cautious" view. In dealing with the claims of Warfield, particularly "Warfield's insistence that miracles ceased", Carson asserts, "But this argument stands up only if such miraculous gifts are theologically tied exclusively to a role of attestation; and that is demonstrably not so." However, while affirming that he does not expect healing to happen today, Carson is critical of aspects of the faith healing movement, "Another issue is that of immense abuses in healing practises.... The most common form of abuse is the view that since all illness is directly or indirectly attributable to the devil and his works, and since Christ by his cross has defeated the devil, and by his Spirit has given us the power to overcome him, healing is the inheritance right of all true Christians who call upon the Lord with genuine faith."

The second level of theological disagreement with Christian faith healing goes further. Commonly referred to as cessationism, its adherents either claim that faith healing will not happen today at all, or may happen today, but it would be unusual. Richard Gaffin argues for a form of cessationism in an essay alongside Saucy's in the book Are Miraculous Gifts for Today? In his book Perspectives on Pentecost Gaffin states of healing and related gifts that "the conclusion to be drawn is that as listed in 1 Corinthians 12(vv. 9f., 29f.) and encountered throughout the narrative in Acts, these gifts,  particularly when exercised regularly by a given individual, are part of the foundational structure of the church... and so have passed out of the life of the church." Gaffin qualifies this, however, by saying "At the same time, however, the sovereign will and power of God today to heal the sick, particularly in response to prayer (see e.g. James 5:14, 15), ought to be acknowledged and insisted on."

Fraud
Skeptics of faith healers point to fraudulent practices either in the healings themselves (such as plants in the audience with fake illnesses), or concurrent with the healing work supposedly taking place and claim that faith healing is a quack practice in which the "healers" use well known non-supernatural illusions to exploit credulous people in order to obtain their gratitude, confidence and money. James Randi's The Faith Healers investigates Christian evangelists such as Peter Popoff, who claimed to heal sick people on stage in front of an audience. Popoff pretended to know private details about participants' lives by receiving radio transmissions from his wife who was off-stage and had gathered information from audience members prior to the show. According to this book, many of the leading modern evangelistic healers have engaged in deception and fraud. The book also questioned how faith healers use funds that were sent to them for specific purposes. Physicist Robert L. Park and doctor and consumer advocate Stephen Barrett have called into question the ethics of some exorbitant fees.

There have also been legal controversies. For example, in 1955 at a Jack Coe revival service in Miami, Florida, Coe told the parents of a three-year-old boy that he healed their son who had polio. Coe then told the parents to remove the boy's leg braces. However, their son was not cured of polio and removing the braces left the boy in constant pain. As a result, through the efforts of Joseph L. Lewis, Coe was arrested and charged on February 6, 1956, with practicing medicine without a license, a felony in the state of Florida. A Florida Justice of the Peace dismissed the case on grounds that Florida exempts divine healing from the law. Later that year Coe was diagnosed with bulbar polio, and died a few weeks later at Dallas' Parkland Hospital on December 17, 1956.

Miracles for sale
TV personality Derren Brown produced a show on faith healing entitled Miracles for Sale which arguably exposed the art of faith healing as a scam. In this show, Derren trained a scuba diver trainer picked from the general public to be a faith healer and took him to Texas to successfully deliver a faith healing session to a congregation.

United States law
The 1974 Child Abuse Prevention and Treatment Act (CAPTA) required states to grant religious exemptions to child neglect and child abuse laws in order to receive federal money. The CAPTA amendments of 1996  state:

Thirty-one states have child-abuse religious exemptions. These are Alabama, Alaska, California, Colorado, Delaware, Florida, Georgia, Idaho, Illinois, Indiana, Iowa, Kansas, Kentucky, Louisiana, Maine, Michigan, Minnesota, Mississippi, Missouri, Montana, Nevada, New Hampshire, New Jersey, New Mexico, Ohio, Oklahoma, Oregon, Pennsylvania, Vermont, Virginia, and Wyoming. In six of these states, Arkansas, Idaho, Iowa, Louisiana, Ohio and Virginia, the exemptions extend to murder and manslaughter. Of these, Idaho is the only state accused of having a large number of deaths due to the legislation in recent times. In February 2015, controversy was sparked in Idaho over a bill believed to further reinforce parental rights to deny their children medical care.

Reckless homicide convictions
Parents have been convicted of child abuse and felony reckless negligent homicide and found responsible for killing their children when they withheld lifesaving medical care and chose only prayers.

See also

 Anointing of the sick
 Breathwork (New Age)
 Efficacy of prayer
 Egregore
 Energy medicine
 Folk medicine
 Huna method (New Age)
 Self-efficacy
 Thaumaturgy
 Witch doctor
 List of ineffective cancer treatments
 List of topics characterized as pseudoscience

Notes

References

Bibliography

 Beyer, Jürgen (2013) "Wunderheilung". In Enzyklopädie des Märchens. Handwörterbuch zur historischen und vergleichenden Erzählforschung, vol. 14, Berlin & Boston: Walter de Gruyter, coll. 1043–1050

External links
 

 
Alternative medicine
Religious practices
Pseudoscience
Religious terminology
Magic (supernatural)
Medical controversies
Health fraud